Jazzhole is an acid jazz band that was formed as a duo by Marlon Saunders and Warren Rosenstein. The band combines hip hop, electronica, and R&B. Saunders is the singer while Rosenstein plays keyboards.

Discography
 The Jazzhole (Bluemoon 1994)
 …And the Feeling Goes Round (Bluemoon 1995)
 The Beat Is the Bomb! (Bluemoon 1996)
 Blackburst (Beave Music, 2000)
 Circle of the Sun (Beave Music, 2002)
 Poet's Walk (Beave Music, 2006)
 Blue 72 (Beave Music, 2014)

References

External links
 Official website

Musical groups from New York City
Acid jazz ensembles